Bhootu is an Indian Bengali language children's comedy-drama television series that aired on Zee Bangla. The series revolves around a friendly girl ghost, "Bhootu", who always tries to help others, often causing light mischief and mayhem in the process. The character is based on Casper the Friendly Ghost. The show was rebooted in Hindi for Zee TV and premiered on 21 August 2017. The show stars Arshiya Mukherjee, Sana Amin Sheikh, Kinshuk Mahajan, Akanksha Chamola and Anjali Priya.

Plot
Bhootu is the story based on cute little ghost. The show revolves around Bhootu/Pihu, a 7-year old friendly ghost. She loves to play with friends and she is very  close to her mother. But she is very sad and disheartened that no one can see her. Meanwhile, Gopal (Krishna) comes to be with her as a companion and he promises that he will make her to meet her mother.

Cast

Main
 Arshiya Mukherjee as Bhutu Majumder / Putu Majumder, Bhutu's younger sister; Bhutu's lookalike; only on final episode

Recurring
 Subrata Guha Roy as Johor Dalal
 Animesh Bhaduri as Deepen Majumder as aka Deepu: Bhutu's father.
 Gita Mukherjee as Bhutu's paternal Grandmother (Thammi)
 Mimi Dutta as Sudha; Bhutu's mother
 Riyanka Dasgupta as Mallika Majumder aka Mishtu.(Mishti pisi)
 Ritoja Majumder / Sanjuktaa Roy Chowdhury as Krishna Majumder; Bhutu's paternal aunt(Jemma)
 Judhajit Banerjee as Bhutu's paternal uncle. (Jethu)
 Samriddho as Logence; Bhutu's close friend.
Suman Banerjee as Prabol: Bhutu's maternal uncle.(Mama)
 Arpita Dutta Chowdhury as Swapna: Probal's wife, Bhutu's maternal aunt.(Mami)
 Saheli Ghosh Roy as Prabol and Swapna's daughter ; Bhutu's maternal cousin
 Dwaipayan Das as Shayan; Nephew of Bhutu's paternal grandfather (Kannakaku)
 Avery Singha Roy as Arna: Shayan's wife, a karate player.(Karate kaki)
 Sampurna Mondal as Ratri's daughter
 Priyam Chakraborty as Borna; Ayon's wife.
 Soma Banerjee as Guruma
 Pallavi Mukherjee as Chaapa: a maid
 Ashmita Chakraborty as Munni: a maid
 Nayana Bandyopadhyay as Minu
 Arnab Vadra as Shibu Chor, Minu's brother (Pocha Rongkaku)
 Anindita Sarkar as Renu Pisi/ Neki pisi Thamma; Bhutu's maternal grand aunt
 Chaitali Chakraborty as Churni Pisi / Ragi pisi Thamma: Bhutu's elder grandaunt 
 Kheyali Dastidar as Pune Pisi
 Prantik Banerjee as Boidujjo Bhowmik
 Riya Ganguly Chakraborty as Ratri: Shayan's sister
 Ranjini Chattopadhyay as Bhutu's maternal grandmother.(Dida)
 Basanti Chatterjee as Mrinal aka Meni: Bhutu's maternal grandaunt.(Masi Thammi)
 Alivia Sarkar as Tania; Bonna's sister, Somu's love interest, Bhutu's Ragi aunty 
 Sourav Chatterjee as Somen Majumder aka Somu: Bhutu's paternal uncle.(Kakai)
 Sourav Das as Johor's nephew
 Amitava Bhattacharyya as Doctor
 Lily Chakravarty as Thummum; grandmother-in-law of Madhobi, Mouli and Lekha; paternal grandmother of Aniket, Ishani and Nirjhor.
 Anindita Raychaudhury as Madhobi / Madhu (as called by her husband) / Mummum; Bhutu's foster mother
 Biresh Chakraborty / Rajiv Bose as Aniket, Madhobi's husband; elder brother of Ishani and Nirjhor
 Manali Dey as Mouli / Bordidi; eldest daughter of third tenant family; Nirjhor's wife
 Anindya Chatterjee as Nirjhor / Bheeturaam Kaku; younger brother of Aniket and Ishani; Mouli's husband
 Sneha Chatterjee as Ishani/Ojha Pisi, sister of Aniket and Nirjhor, sister-in-law of Madhobi and Mouli
 Mou Bhattacharya as the mother of Ishani, Aniket and Nirjhor
 Pritha Bandopadhyay as Roma; Lekha's mother-in-law; paternal aunt of Aniket, Ishani and Nirjhor
 Elfina Mukherjee as Lekha
 Aritra Dutta as Roma's son; Lekha's husband
 Priya Malakar as Roma's daughter; Lekha's sister-in-law
 Boni Mukherjee as school teacher
 Ambarish Bhattacharya as school teacher
 Palash Ganguly as Palash;Mouli's former fiancé
 Moumita Chakrabarty / Dola Chakraborty as Konok; Mouli's stepmother. Bhutu's Gol Jethi
 Sakshi Dona Saha as Mouli's youngest step-sister
 Manasi Sinha as Logence's Pisi Thammi, paternal grandaunt
 Shraboni Bonik as Reetu; Logence's aunt (Jemma) and Rupsha's mother
 Rohit Mukherjee as Anup; Logence's uncle (Jethu) and Rupsha's father
 Fahim Mirza as Asit; Logence's father and Rupsha's uncle
 Anindita Bhattacharya as Tonu; Logence's mother and Rupsha's aunt
 Somjita Bhattacharya as Jilipi Masi: Maids of house
 Swarnadipto Ghosh as Amit; Logence and Rupsha's uncle (Kaka)
 Kanyakumari Mukherjee as Rumi; Logence and Rupsha's paternal aunt (Mishti Pisi)
 Aditya Roy as Bikram; Rumi's lover
 Anindya Banerjee as Ronodeep
 Goutam Mukherjee as Ronodeep's Paternal Uncle, Anup's Boss
 Ishita Chatterjee as Ronodeep's mother

Broadcast
This show has been remade in Kannada as Anjali the Friendly Ghost which aired on Zee Kannada. The show is dubbed in Hindi is telecast on Zee Anmol as Laddoo. It also aired in Malayalam named as Vellinakshathram on Zee Keralam.

Adaptations

References

External links
 Bhootu at ZEE5

Indian children's television series
Indian comedy television series
2016 Indian television series debuts
2017 Indian television series endings
Zee Bangla original programming
Bengali-language television programming in India